The NWA Texas Heavyweight Championship is a professional wrestling title that has existed since the 1930s. Though its exact date of creation isn't known, it is among the oldest championships used in professional wrestling today. The title has used a variety of different names over the years, which consists of initial changes to represent the various companies that have controlled the title at different times. Originally, it was simply known as the Texas Heavyweight Championship until its name was changed after the formation of the National Wrestling Alliance in 1948. For most of the title's existence, at least until the early 1990s, it was defended almost exclusively within the Dallas, Fort Worth, Houston and San Antonio areas of Texas. From the 1930s to the mid-1960s, these cities and the surrounding towns were within the territory operated by Ed McLemore, which was known simply as Southwest Sports, Inc. at the time. After McLemore's death, the territory came under the control of Fritz Von Erich and was renamed as Big Time Wrestling. However, the promotion would be renamed World Class Championship Wrestling in the early 1980s, which is the name the territory is best remembered under today. The championship remained an NWA affiliated title until February 1986.

In 1986, WCCW withdrew from the NWA and changed their name to the World Class Wrestling Association, while still promoting under the WCCW banner. The title became the WCWA Texas Heavyweight Championship at this time. In August 1989, the title became the USWA Texas Heavyweight Championship in the United States Wrestling Association when WCCW was transformed into the USWA.

It was renamed the WCWA Texas Heavyweight Championship in July 1990 after the WCWA split from the USWA, then became the USWA Texas Heavyweight Championship again from January 1991 until February 1992, when it became inactive. It then reverted to its original name when awarded to NWA Southwest, where it was used until that promotion shut down in September 2011. It then went to NWA Houston, where it was subsequently merged with the NWA Lone Star Heavyweight Championship in a title unification match when Jax Dane defeated Raymond Rowe, NWA Lone Star Champion Ryan Genesis and NWA Texas Champion Scott Summers to unify the titles on December 14, 2012, in Cypress, Texas. The title was brought back in 2021 when Devon Nicholson bough it from a private owner. He used the title in the promotion Southwest Wrestling Entertainment, where Nicholson (wrestling as The Blood Hunter)] defeated Gangrel in the finals of a battle royal-based tournament to become the first champion in 8 years. However, he vacated the title the next year and sold the belt to a private collector.

Championship tournaments

NWA Texas Championship Tournament (1967)
The NWA Texas Championship Tournament was a one-night single elimination tag team tournament held in Dallas, Texas on May 2, 1967, for the vacant NWA Texas Heavyweight Championship.

NWA Texas Championship Tournament (1984)
The NWA Texas Championship Tournament was a one-night single elimination tournament held in San Antonio, Texas on June 23, 1984, for the vacant NWA Texas Heavyweight Championship.

†Kerry Von Erich was originally in the bracket set to face Ric Flair in the final round. But his injury prevented him from competing, and thus was replaced by Gino Hernandez

WCCW Texas Championship Tournament (1987)
The WCCW Texas Championship Tournament was a one-night single elimination tournament held in Fort Worth, Texas on January 12, 1987, for the vacant WCCW Texas Heavyweight Championship.

USWA Texas Championship Tournament (1991)
The USWA Texas Championship Tournament was a one-night single elimination tournament held in Dallas, Texas on January 25, 1991, to crown the first-ever USWA Texas Heavyweight Champion.

Title history

Combined reigns
Key

Footnotes

See also

List of National Wrestling Alliance championships
World Class Championship Wrestling
United States Wrestling Association
Global Wrestling Federation
Continental Wrestling Association

References
General reference

Global Wrestling Federation championships
United States Wrestling Association championships
World Class Championship Wrestling championships
National Wrestling Alliance state wrestling championships
Professional wrestling in Texas